c't –  (Magazine for Computer Technology) is a German computer magazine, published by the Heinz Heise publishing house.

History and profile
The first issue of the magazine was the November/December 1983 edition. Originally a special section of the electronics magazine elrad, the magazine has been published monthly since December 1983 and biweekly since October 1997. A Dutch edition also exists which is published monthly. In addition, since 2008 a Russian licensed-title version named  is published in Moscow.

The magazine is the second most popular German-language computer magazine with a sold circulation of about 315,000 (printed circulation: 419,000). With 241,000 subscriptions it is the computer magazine with the most subscribers in Europe.

c't covers both hardware and software; it focuses on software for the Microsoft Windows platform, but Linux and Apple Computer are also regularly featured. The magazine has a reputation of being very thorough, although critics claim that the magazine has been "dumbed down" in recent years to accommodate the mass market.

With Offline Update burned to a CD or DVD, a technician can update Windows 2000/XP/Vista and Microsoft Office 2003/2007 without an Internet connection. This is especially useful for people with no or slow Internet connections, or not exposing a vulnerable system to the Internet.

A sister magazine, iX, focuses on topics for IT professionals.

Popularity 
c't became widely known in 1995 when it rated the program SoftRAM "Placebo-Software" in a short test. When the German distributor of the program took legal action to forbid publishing this rating, c't followed up with an exhaustive test showing that the program had virtually no effect other than giving false information about system statistics. The subsequent media coverage forced SoftRAM out not only from the German market, but from the US market too.

References

External links 
 
 c't Netherlands homepage
 Heise Verlag homepage and news site
 
 Offline Update (now "WSUS Offline Update") download page

1983 establishments in West Germany
Biweekly magazines published in Germany
Dutch-language magazines
Computer magazines published in Germany
German-language magazines
Monthly magazines published in Germany
Magazines established in 1983